Gazebo Books is an Australia-based independent publisher of literary fiction, non-fiction and poetry.

Background 
Gazebo Books was co-founded by writer Xavier Hennekinne and has been publishing literary works of international and Australian fiction and non-fiction since 2018. Authors published include Catherine Rey, Sanaz Fotouhi, Sreedhevi Iyer, artist Patrick Hartigan, Wanjikũ Wa Ngũgĩ, and Nobel Prize winner Elfriede Jelinek.

In 2020, Gazebo Books launched its poetry imprint Life Before Man, edited by artist Phil Day, and releasing collections by S. K. Kelen, Cassandra Atherton,Paul Hetherington, Subhash Jaireth, Anthony Lawrence, Alex Selenitsch, Naveen Kishore, Kimberly Williams and Natalie Cooke, and the international anthology Alcatraz.

Gazebo Books commissions translations into English. Notably, in December 2022, it released Around the world with writers, scientists and philosophers, by French philosopher Michel Serres, translated by Gila Walker, and in April 2023, The Mud of a Century by Yuka Ishii.

Gazebo Books publications are distributed by New South Books through Alliance Distribution Services.

References

External links
 

Book publishing companies of Australia
Publishing companies established in 2018
2018 establishments in Australia